"Fraction Too Much Friction" is a song by New Zealand musician, Tim Finn, released in May 1983 as his debut single from his debut studio album, Escapade. The song reached number 2 on the New Zealand charts and number 6 in Australia.

At the 1983 Countdown Australian Music Awards, "Fraction Too Much Friction" won Best Video.

Track listing
Australian/New Zealand  7" single (K-9118)
A. "Fraction Too Much Friction – 4:14
B. "Below the Belt" – 4:20

Charts

Weekly charts

Year-end charts

References

1983 songs
1983 singles
Songs written by Tim Finn
Mushroom Records singles